Al Simon (November 11, 1911 – May 18, 2000) was an American producer and production manager. He served as an executive producer in Mister Ed and The Beverly Hillbillies, also producing television programs such as The Jack Benny Program, I Love Lucy, The George Burns and Gracie Allen Show, The Bob Cummings Show, I Married Joan, Petticoat Junction, My Sister Eileen and Green Acres. Simon died in May 2000 of Alzheimer's disease at the Cedars-Sinai Medical Center in Beverly Hills, California, at the age of 88.

References

External links 

1911 births
2000 deaths
People from New York (state)
Screenwriters from New York (state)
American male screenwriters
American television writers
American male television writers
American television producers
20th-century American male writers
Columbia University alumni
New York University alumni
Unit production managers